Korotnevella is a genus of Amoebozoa.

It includes the species Korotnevella hemistylolepis.

References

Amoebozoa genera
Discosea